Dr. Ferenc Vargha (26 November 1858 – 30 September 1940) was a Hungarian jurist, who served as Crown Prosecutor of Hungary from 1923 to 1930.

References
 Magyar Életrajzi Lexikon

1858 births
1940 deaths
Hungarian jurists
People from Kecskemét